Jinnan District, formerly Nanjiao District  is a district of Tianjin, People's Republic of China, located on the western bank of the lower reaches of the Hai River The name of the district literally means "South Tianjin" or "South of Tianjin", explained by its location relative to the urban core of Tianjin.

Administrative divisions
There are 8 towns in the district:

Transportation

Metro
Jinnan is currently served by one metro line operated by Tianjin Metro:

  - Shuanglin

Education
The International School of Tianjin is in this district.

Climate 

Jinnan District has a humid continental climate (Köppen climate classification Dwa).

References

External links

Districts of Tianjin
Tianjin